San Marcos de la Sierra is a municipality in the Honduran department of Intibucá.

Demographics
At the time of the 2013 Honduras census, San Marcos de la Sierra municipality had a population of 8,653. Of these, 91.86% were Indigenous (91.74% Lenca), 7.96% Mestizo, 0.16% Black or Afro-Honduran and 0.02% White.

References

Municipalities of the Intibucá Department